Wallace, West Virginia may refer to:

Wallace, Harrison County, West Virginia, an unincorporated community in Harrison County
Wallace, Kanawha County, West Virginia, an unincorporated community in Kanawha County